Bohemian National Cemetery, also known as Oak Hill Cemetery, is a cemetery located at 1300 Horners Lane, Armistead Gardens in East Baltimore, Maryland.

History
The cemetery was built in 1884 and was added to the National Register of Historic Places on November 11, 2010.  It was established by members of Baltimore's Czech community as a burial ground for Protestant and irreligious Czechs.  The property is owned by the Grand Lodge Česko-Slovenská Podporující Společnost (C.S.P.S.) Benevolent Association of Baltimore.  Historically, buildings on the property were used to host social events, Sokol sports events, and other Bohemian/Czech cultural activities.

Over the course of a decade, the Grand Lodge Č.S.P.S. President C. Jeanne Táborský and her organization have worked to maintain and repair the cemetery grounds and turn a small building at the cemetery into a museum and cultural center called the "Bohemians of Baltimore Museum". Since the neighborhood of Little Bohemia is long dispersed, the Bohemian National Cemetery is one of the few remnants of the Czech culture remaining in Baltimore, so the Č.S.P.S. has focused much of its energy on preserving the cemetery.

Popular culture

John Waters mentions both the cemetery and the surrounding neighborhood in his book Role Models:
Armistead Gardens, a neighborhood originally built as public housing for the influx of people coming to work in factories during World War II. It has been called a "white ghetto" of "row-ranchers," surprising in their "now outdated modernity." There is an amazing graveyard nearby where the star of my early movie Eat Your Makeup, Maelcum Soul, is buried. No one ever shops in Armistead Gardens.

Notable interments
 William R. Jecelin, a soldier in the United States Army who posthumously received the United States Medal of Honor for his actions during the Korean War.
 August Klecka, politician and newspaper publisher.
 Maelcum Soul, actress in John Waters's early films Roman Candles and Eat Your Makeup.
 Dutch Ulrich, professional baseball player.

See also
 Grand Lodge Č.S.P.S. of Baltimore
 Czech-Slovak Protective Society
 Sokol
 :Category:Burials at Bohemian National Cemetery (Baltimore)

References

Further reading
 Bohemian National Cemetery, Baltimore, Md. : burials 1885–1986, Baltimore, Md. : S.n., n.d.

External links

 
 Official webpage for Bohemian National Cemetery
 Photograph of sign in Czech and English at gate entrance
 Bohemian National Cemetery, Baltimore, Md: burials 1885–1986
 Inventory of names for Bohemian National Cemetery
 , including undated photo, at Maryland Historical Trust

1884 establishments in Maryland
Armistead Gardens, Baltimore
Cemeteries in Baltimore
Cemeteries on the National Register of Historic Places in Baltimore
Czech-American culture in Baltimore
Czech-American history
Czech-Slovak Protective Society
Protestantism in Maryland
Secularism in Maryland
Slovak-American culture in Maryland
Sokol in the United States